The fig sign is a mildly obscene gesture used at least since the Roman Age in Italy, Southern Europe, parts of the Mediterranean region, including in  Turkish culture, and has also been adopted by Slavic cultures and South Africa. The gesture uses a thumb wedged in between two fingers. This gesture is most commonly used to ward off the evil eye, insult someone, or deny a request. It is also used more innocuously in Northwestern Europe and countries such as the UK, US, Canada, Australia, the Netherlands and Czech Republic to pretend taking the nose off a child. 

Because of its origins in Southern Europe or Latin Europe, the gesture was imported to Latin America.

The hand gesture may have originated in ancient Indian culture to depict the lingam and yoni.

The letter "T" in the American manual alphabet is very similar to this gesture.

The word sycophant comes from the Ancient Greek word συκοφάντης (sykophántēs), meaning "one who shows or reveals figs"; though there is no unequivocal explanation as to the reason why sycophants in Ancient Greece were so called, one explanation is that the sycophant, by making false accusations, insulted the defendant in a manner analogous to making the fig sign. Middle easterners still use it as an insult.

International nomenclature

Notably, a remnant of its usage is found in Dante's Divine Comedy (Inferno, Canto XXV), and it is commonly represented in medieval paintings of the Man of Sorrow.. The same gesture is now used, as a joke, with children, but represents the stealing of the nose and has no offensive or intimate meaning.
 In Greece and particularly in the Ionian Islands this gesture is still used as an alternative to the moutza. It is known as a "fist-phallus", and can be accompanied by extending the right hand while clasping the left hand under one's armpit in a derogatory manner.
 In Armenia this gesture is still used, when someone asks you something and you dont feel like doing it or you feel annoyed you respond with the Fig sign, it can also have a Sexual meaning and it can be used as a way to say F**k You.
 In Japan this sign is called  and means sex. This hand gesture is still used up until today.
In Russia, Poland it is used when denying a request. For example, when asked to hand something over, a child might make the gesture, thereby implying that they will not give it.
 In Belarus, it is not considered an obscene gesture; it is rather used to express disagreement or denial in a rude form, but it doesn't have insulting or abusing someone as its main goal. Parents won't care much about their children using this gesture, unlike for the middle finger which is considered obscene. 
 In Carinthia it’s used to derisively dismiss the size of a man’s genitalia.
 In Lithuania it's called  and usually when using it some would say . As well as in Russia and Poland it means denying a request and refusing to do it. It's not as commonly used now, but more by the parents generation born around 1950s–60s as well as their parents' generation too.
 In Croatia, Serbia and Slovenia it is used when denying a request or when swearing a false oath. In the request denial case it is called a fig but also a "rose hip" ( / ).  (here is a fig/rose hip for you!) is a slightly rude but also a humorous way of rejecting someone's request. In addition — it is also used when swearing a false oath or falsifying an affirmation to tell the truth. In this case, it is said that a person is taking a false oath by hiding a fig sign in a pocket.
  In Turkey, it is an obscene gesture equivalent to showing the middle finger, and is also used to show disagreement at a statement or to deny a request. In the latter sense, it is often accompanied by the (rude)  conveying negation or disagreement (see wiktionary:nah), or by the imperative  meaning 'take it!', or the combination of the two:  meaning 'you will get nothing!' It is used in a similar context in Bulgaria and Ukraine.
In Korea, it has a likewise meaning as in Turkey as to mean "Here have it!", often accompanied by a gesture in which one looks through his/her pockets as of searching something later to reveal the fig sign. It's an old sign and fallen into mostly disuse. 
 In many countries, such as the United States, the United Kingdom, Ireland, Canada, France, Spain, Denmark, Czech Republic, Argentina and Uruguay, this sign has no obscene meaning and is instead used in a game where a player "steals" someone else's nose. This is usually done with small children where the player pretends to take their nose and then say "I've got your nose". The thumb represents the "stolen" nose held between the player's index and middle finger. This innocent meaning may exist alongside the obscene one.
 In Indonesia and the Netherlands, it is known as a gesture symbol for sexual intercourse. Where the thumb represent the male genitalia, the middle and index finger act as the female genitalia, this is to replicate the penetration of the male genitalia into the female genitalia. This hand gesture is still popular up until today especially among men.
 In South Africa, it was once known as "the zap sign" and was the equivalent of giving the finger. The sign is nowadays known as the toffee sign, particularly in Afrikaans culture. 
 In Portugal, Galicia and in Brazil it is a gesture of good luck, or even wishing good luck. It is also believed to ward off evil eye and protect oneself from evil. 
 In Madagascar, the gesture is an insult referring to one's mother's genitalia.
 In Romania and Moldova the gesture is an insult often referring to "Hai sictir" which means shut up or fuck off.
In Mongolia, the gesure is called salaavch (Mongolian: Салаавч) and means branch. This is referencing the way how the thumb branches out from between the index and middle finger. It is used to insult someone.

See also

I've got your nose

References

Hand gestures